Anne Létourneau (born August 31, 1958) is a Canadian film and television actress from Quebec. She is most noted for her performance as Rita Toulouse in the film The Plouffe Family (Les Plouffe), for which she was a Genie Award nominee for Best Supporting Actress at the 3rd Genie Awards in 1982.

She is the daughter of actors Jacques Létourneau and Monique Lepage.

References

External links

1958 births
Living people
20th-century Canadian actresses
21st-century Canadian actresses
Canadian television actresses
Canadian film actresses
French Quebecers
Actresses from Quebec